István Dubrovszky (born 13 September 1959) is a Hungarian judoka. He competed in the men's heavyweight event at the 1988 Summer Olympics.

References

External links
 

1959 births
Living people
Hungarian male judoka
Olympic judoka of Hungary
Judoka at the 1988 Summer Olympics
Sportspeople from Baranya County